Woodstock Studios is a Recording studio Located in Balaclava, Melbourne. The studio was established in 1994 by Australian musician, Joe Camilleri, leader of Jo Jo Zep & The Falcons and The Black Sorrows and is now owned by Richard Stolz (Record Producer/Engineer)  It has been used by many leading artists including: Augie March, John Butler Trio, The Cat Empire, Saskwatch, Tash Sultana, Julia Stone, Milky Chance, The Paper Kites and Paul Kelly.

References

Recording studios in Australia